Robert King (12 August 1894 – 23 February 1979) was an Australian rules football player at the Fitzroy Football Club in the Victorian Football League (VFL). He became a premiership player at Fitzroy, playing in the 1916 VFL Grand Final, under the captaincy of Wally Johnson, with George Holden as coach. King made his debut against  in Round 4 of the 1916 VFL season.

King, who worked at the Newport Railway Workshops, transferred to Williamstown in the VFA during 1921 and debuted in the round 10 match at Williamstown against Footscray at the age of 26. He was best-on-ground at centre-half back in Williamstown's 1921 premiership victory over Footscray at Fitzroy's Brunswick Street Oval, and his spectacular marking in this game was still talked about years later. He crossed to Williamstown Juniors as captain-coach in 1922 before returning to Williamstown for one final season in 1923. He played a total of 29 games for the Villagers without kicking a goal.

References

External links
 
 

1894 births
1979 deaths
Fitzroy Football Club players
Fitzroy Football Club Premiership players
Australian rules footballers from Victoria (Australia)
One-time VFL/AFL Premiership players